The 1999 WGC-Andersen Consulting Match Play Championship was a golf tournament that was played from February 24–28, 1999 at La Costa Resort and Spa in Carlsbad, California. It was the first WGC-Andersen Consulting Match Play Championship and the first of three World Golf Championships events held in 1999.

Jeff Maggert won his first World Golf Championships event at the match-play, by defeating Andrew Magee on the 38th hole in the 36 hole final that went extra holes.

Brackets
The Championship was a single elimination match play event. The field consisted of the top 64 players available from the Official World Golf Ranking as of the February 14 ranking, seeded according to those rankings. 

Jumbo Osaki (ranked #13) chose not to play and was replaced by Nick Faldo (#65).

Bobby Jones bracket

Ben Hogan bracket

Gary Player bracket

Sam Snead bracket

Final Four

Breakdown by country

Prize money breakdown

References

External links
 Bracket PDF

WGC Match Play
Golf in California
Carlsbad, California
Sports competitions in San Diego County, California
WGC-Andersen Consulting Match Play Championship
WGC-Andersen Consulting Match Play Championship
WGC-Andersen Consulting Match Play Championship
WGC-Andersen Consulting Match Play Championship